Hajjiabad-e Shanrash (also Romanized as Ḩājjīābād-e Shānrash; also known as Ḩājjīābād) is a village in Dowlatabad Rural District, in the Central District of Ravansar County, Kermanshah Province, Iran. At the 2006 census, its population was 146, in 31 families.

References 

Populated places in Ravansar County